Jesse D. Crane (October 2, 1841May 20, 1914) was a Michigan politician.

Early life 
Crane was born on October 2, 1841 in New York to parents Elam and Eliza Crane. His family moved to a farm in Fenton, Michigan in 1846.

Personal life 
Crane married Elizabeth. Together they had five children. Elizabeth died by 1900.

Career 
Crane was a farmer. Crane was sworn in as a member of the Michigan Senate from the 13th district on January 4, 1893 and served until 1894.

Death 
Crane dies on May 20, 1914 in Fenton, Michigan.

References 

1841 births
1914 deaths
Republican Party Michigan state senators
19th-century American politicians
Farmers from Michigan